Paul Odlin (born 19 September 1978) is a New Zealand professional racing cyclist, best known for winning the 2012 New Zealand national championship in the individual time trial. Odlin currently runs the coaching business Odlin Cycle Coaching, helping New Zealand cyclists gain success.

Major results
Sources:

2003
 9th Time trial, National Road Championships
2005
 1st Stage 4 Tour de Vineyards 
2007
 2nd Main Divide Cycle Race
 3rd Overall Tour of Canterbury
1st Stage 1  
 3rd  Road race Oceania Cycling Championships 
 4th Time trial, National Road Championships
2008
 1st Stage 1 Tour de Vineyards
 1st Stage 5 New Zealand Cycle Classic
 8th Overall Tour of Southland
 National Road Championships
2nd Time trial
10th Road race
 Oceania Cycling Championships 
3rd  Road race
4th Time trial
2009
 4th Time trial, National Road Championships
2010
 6th Time trial, National Road Championships
2011
 6th Time trial, National Road Championships
 9th Overall Tour of Southland
2012
 1st  Time trial, National Road Championships
 Oceania Cycling Championships 
1st   Road race
2nd Time trial
2013
 Oceania Cycling Championships 
1st   Time trial
 1st Sprint classification New Zealand Cycle Classic
 2nd Time trial, National Road Championships
2014
 4th Time trial, National Road Championships
2015
 7th Time trial, National Road Championships
2016
 5th Time trial, National Road Championships
2017
 8th Time trial, National Road Championships
2018
 5th Time trial, National Road Championships
 8th Overall Tour of Southland

References

External links

Living people
New Zealand male cyclists
1978 births
Place of birth missing (living people)